Alf Gunnar Sköld (24 September 1894 – 24 June 1971) was a Swedish road racing cyclist who competed in the 1924 Summer Olympics. He finished fourth in the individual road race and won a team bronze medal. At the inaugural amateur world championships in 1921 he won the road race and finished fourth in 1922 edition.

After retiring from competitions Sköld worked as treasurer and vice president of his native club Upsala CK and ran a sports shop.

References 

1894 births
1971 deaths
Swedish male cyclists
Olympic cyclists of Sweden
Cyclists at the 1924 Summer Olympics
Olympic bronze medalists for Sweden
Olympic medalists in cycling
Sportspeople from Västerås
Medalists at the 1924 Summer Olympics